The Wasa Research Station is a Swedish research facility in Antarctica, established in 1988/1989. It is situated next to the Finnish Aboa Research Station on the Basen nunatak in the Kraul Mountains in Queen Maud Land. The two stations cooperate, and are jointly referred to as the Nordenskiöld Base Camp.

Purpose and facilities
The Wasa Station is operated by the Swedish Polar Research Secretariat during the summer season, and accommodates up to 20 people. It features four bedrooms, a big kitchen and a living room. There is also a shower, a sauna and a laundry room. The station was designed to be extremely energy efficient, with energy supplied mainly by solar and wind power.

The Swedish Polar Research Secretariat has developed a system of tracked vehicles, sledges and housing modules for transportation to the scientists’ workplaces. Snowmobiles are used for shorter, less laborious fieldwork. Wasa and the other research stations in Dronning Maud Land are reached through the aviation partnership within DROMLaN, the Dronning Maud Land Air Network.

This article is based on information from the Swedish Wikipedia-article about the same subject, and on information obtained from the official site of the Swedish Polar Research Secretariat.

See also
 List of Antarctic research stations
 List of Antarctic field camps
 Crime in Antarctica

References

Outposts of Queen Maud Land
Buildings and structures completed in 1989
Princess Martha Coast
1988 establishments in Antarctica
Sweden and the Antarctic